The National Piers Society (NPS) is a registered charity in the United Kingdom dedicated to promoting and sustaining interest in the preservation and continued enjoyment of seaside piers.

It was founded in 1979, with Sir John Betjeman as the first Honorary President. Currently the role is filled by Gavin Henderson , Principal of the Royal Central School of Speech & Drama, with Tim Mickleburgh (Chair 1995-2003) as Honorary Vice President. 

The NPS became a registered charity in 1999, and quarterly magazines have been published since 1987. The society also lobbies heritage bodies, lottery boards, local authorities and the media on pier issues. In 2014 it worked with English Heritage to bring out the book British Seaside Piers.

The Annual General Meeting takes place at a different resort each year, beginning in 1983. The meetings usually include private tours of nearby piers. In addition to establishing regional branches, the society is working to create a National Piers Museum.

The NPS maintains links with the relevant trade association, the British Association of Leisure Parks, Piers and Attractions, and the Paddle Steamer Preservation Society (PSPS).

In 2005, a limited company – The National Piers Society Ltd. – was created as the NPS trading arm.

Pier of the Year award
Since 1996 the society has presented an annual Pier of the Year award, as voted by the society's members. The rules state that only piers currently open to the public, and piers which have not won the award in the last five years, are eligible. Past awards have been given to:

The society also presents a triennial award for engineering excellence, the Peter Mason Award, named after a past Chairman.

Notes and references

External links
 

Piers in the United Kingdom
1979 establishments in the United Kingdom
Organizations established in 1979
Heritage organisations in the United Kingdom